The UNLV Rebels football statistical leaders are individual statistical leaders of the UNLV Rebels football program in various categories, including passing, rushing, receiving, total offense, defensive stats, and kicking. Within those areas, the lists identify single-game, single-season, and career leaders. The Rebels represent the University of Nevada, Las Vegas in the NCAA's Mountain West Conference (MW).

UNLV began competing in intercollegiate football in 1968. This is recent enough that, unlike most college football teams, there is no "pre-modern" era without complete statistics. However, these lists are still dominated by more recent players for several reasons:
 Since 1968, seasons have increased from 10 games to 11 and then 12 games in length.
 Bowl games only began counting toward single-season and career statistics in 2002. The Rebels have played in one bowl game since this decision, the Heart of Dallas Bowl after the 2013 season, and, sure enough, 2013 has many more entries on these lists than surrounding years.
 Additionally, UNLV has been grouped in the same MW football division as Hawaii since divisional play began in 2013, meaning that it plays at Hawaii every other year (currently in even-numbered years). This is relevant because the NCAA allows teams that play at Hawaii in a given season to schedule 13 regular-season games instead of the normal 12. Before divisional play began, UNLV scheduled 13 regular-season games in two seasons that it visited Hawaii—in 2010, before Hawaii joined MW football, and 2012, when Hawaii had joined but the league had yet to split into divisions. Since divisional play began, UNLV has played 13 regular-season games once, in 2014 (it was eligible to do so in 2016, but chose not to).

These lists are updated through the end of the 2016 season.

Passing

Passing yards

Passing touchdowns

Rushing

Rushing yards

Rushing touchdowns

Receiving

Receptions

Receiving yards

Receiving touchdowns

Total offense
Total offense is the sum of passing and rushing statistics. It does not include receiving or returns.

Total offense yards

Total touchdowns

Defense

Interceptions

Tackles

Sacks

Kicking

Field goals made

Field goal percentage

References

UNLV

Nevada sports-related lists